Dembeni is a commune in the French overseas department of Mayotte, in the Indian Ocean.

Geography

Climate
Dembeni has a tropical savanna climate (Köppen climate classification Aw).

Demographics
Demographic evolution of Dembeni

References

Populated places in Mayotte
Communes of Mayotte